Mark Phelan (born 1982) is an Irish hurler who played as a right corner-back for the Kilkenny senior team.

Phelan joined the team during the 2004 Walsh Cup and was a regular member of the team for two seasons. During that time he failed to win any honours at senior level. He has won two All-Ireland and 3 Leinster winners' medals in the intermediate grade.

At club level Phelan is a one-time  county club championship medalist with Glenmore.

References

1983 births
Living people
Glenmore hurlers
Kilkenny inter-county hurlers